= Hæren =

Hæren is a Danish and Norwegian language word meaning "The Army". It may refer to:

- Norwegian Army
- Royal Danish Army
